Björnert Cliffs are a series of ice-covered cliffs which face seaward along the northern side of McDonald Heights, Marie Byrd Land. The feature was photographed from aircraft of the U.S. Antarctic Service, 1939–41, and was mapped by the United States Geological Survey from surveys and from U.S. Navy air photos, 1959–66. They were named by the Advisory Committee on Antarctic Names (1974) for Rolf P. Björnert of the Office of Polar Programs, National Science Foundation, who served in the capacity of Station Projects Manager for Antarctica.

References
 

Cliffs of Marie Byrd Land